Mael Ruanaidh na Paidre Ua hEidhin (died 1014) was King of Ui Fiachrach Aidhne.

Mael Ruanaidh was the first of the Ua hEidhin kings to rule Aidhne, the last of whom, Eoghan Ó hEidhin, died in 1340.

Mael Ruanaidh was a partisan of Brian Boru, and may have been related by marriage. He fought on the side of Brian at the Battle of Clontarf in 1014, where he died.

References
 http://www.clarelibrary.ie/eolas/coclare/genealogy/hynes_family.htm
 Irish Kings and High-Kings, Francis John Byrne (2001), Dublin: Four Courts Press, 
 CELT: Corpus of Electronic Texts at University College Cork

People from County Galway
11th-century Irish monarchs
1014 deaths
Gaels